Paul Roger Nioze (born 19 March 1967) is a Seychellois former triple jumper who competed at the 1992 and 1996 Summer Olympics, finishing in 22nd and 39th place, respectively. He is the 1996 African Champion and the national record holder. Furthermore, he was named the Seychelles Sportsman of the Year in 1996, and retired in 2000.

He is currently the manager of the World Anti-Doping Agency (WADA) Indian Ocean regional office, overseeing work in five countries in Southeastern Africa. Nioze was first appointed as a WADA independent observer in 2005, and worked the 2006 Winter Olympics in Turin.

Competition record

Personal bests
Triple jump – 16.80 m (Antananarivo, 1990) NR

Personal life
His niece, Diane Nioze, competes professionally in the 100 metres and long jump events. She won first in both events at the 2012 World Athletics Day Meet, and later competed at the 2013 Jeux de la Francophonie.

In addition to working with WADA, Nioze frequently organizes youth athletics competitions in his home country, collaborating with the Seychelles Athletics Federation.

References

External links
 Paul Nioze profile at IAAF
 Paul Nioze profile at All-Athletics.com
 
 

Living people
1967 births
Seychellois male triple jumpers
Olympic athletes of Seychelles
Athletes (track and field) at the 1992 Summer Olympics
Athletes (track and field) at the 1996 Summer Olympics
World Athletics Championships athletes for Seychelles
Commonwealth Games competitors for Seychelles
Athletes (track and field) at the 1990 Commonwealth Games
Athletes (track and field) at the 1998 Commonwealth Games
African Games silver medalists for Seychelles
African Games medalists in athletics (track and field)
Athletes (track and field) at the 1991 All-Africa Games
Athletes (track and field) at the 1999 All-Africa Games
20th-century Seychellois people
21st-century Seychellois people